Olivet Community Schools is a public school district located in Olivet, Michigan. It comprises three schools and two buildings. Fern Persons Elementary School is located in southern Olivet and consists of about 400 students.  Olivet High School and Olivet Middle School are located in a building in northern Olivet and consists of 300 and 500 students respectively.

References

External links
 District Website

School districts in Michigan
Education in Eaton County, Michigan